Sophie Celine Anthamatten (born 26 July 1991 in Saas-Grund, Switzerland) is a Swiss ice hockey goaltender.

International career
Anthamatten was selected for the Switzerland national women's ice hockey team in the 2010 Winter Olympics, but did not play during the tournament.

Anthamatten has also appeared for Switzerland at three IIHF Women's World Championships. Her first appearance came in 2011 IIHF Women's World Championship, where she allowed six goals in 25 minutes of playing time. She also played at the 2012 IIHF Women's World Championship, and once at the 2013 IIHF Women's World Championship. Her best performance came in 2012, when she played in 2 games, with a GAA of 3.38. She served as the backup in the medal round of the 2012 tournament, winning a bronze medal behind Florence Schelling

She also represented her country at junior level, playing for the Switzerland women's national under-18 ice hockey team. In 2008, she played in five games, winning two, with a goals against average of 4.81. In 2009, she played in five games, winning one and posting a GAA of 5.59

Career statistics

International career

References

External links
Eurohockey.com Profile

1991 births
Living people
Ice hockey players at the 2010 Winter Olympics
Ice hockey players at the 2014 Winter Olympics
Medalists at the 2014 Winter Olympics
Olympic bronze medalists for Switzerland
Olympic ice hockey players of Switzerland
Olympic medalists in ice hockey
Sportspeople from Valais
Swiss women's ice hockey goaltenders